Behtash Fariba (born February 11, 1955) is a retired Iranian football player and now coach

Club career
He played for a few clubs, including Rah Ahan F.C., Pas Tehran and Esteghlal F.C.

With Pas F.C. he won the Iranian Takht Jamshid in 1978.

With Esteghlal F.C. he won the Tehran Province League in 1983 and 1985.

International career
He played for the Iran national football team and was a participant at the 1978 FIFA World Cup, where he was substituted in Iran's last match against Peru.

He also competed at the 1980 Asian Cup in Kuwait and reached the third place with the Iranian team as one of the top scorers of the tournament.

External links

1955 births
Living people
Iranian footballers
Esteghlal F.C. players
Pas players
rah Ahan players
1978 FIFA World Cup players
1980 AFC Asian Cup players
Iran international footballers
Association football forwards